The 2005 Women's Six Nations Championship, also known as the 2005 RBS Women's 6 Nations due to the tournament's sponsorship by the Royal Bank of Scotland, was the fourth series of the rugby union Women's Six Nations Championship and was won by , who achieved their second successive Grand Slam.

Table

Results

Leading points scorers

See also
Women's Six Nations Championship
Women's international rugby

References

External links
The official RBS Six Nations Site

2005
2005 rugby union tournaments for national teams
2004–05 in Irish rugby union
2004–05 in English rugby union
2004–05 in Welsh rugby union
2004–05 in Scottish rugby union
2004–05 in Spanish rugby union
2004–05 in European women's rugby union
rugby union
rugby union
rugby union
rugby union
International women's rugby union competitions hosted by Spain
Women
rugby union
rugby union
Women's Six Nations
Women's Six Nations